Tazi may refer to:

Afghan Hound or Tāzī, a hound
Chief Taza or Tazi, (c. 1843–1876), son of Cochise and chief of the Chiricahuas
Tazi, a classification of horse in the Army of the Mughal Empire
Tāzīg/Tāzīk/Tāzī, the word for "Arab" in Sasanian Persia

People 
Abdallah Tazi (born 1945), Moroccan footballer
Abdelhadi Tazi (1921–2015), Moroccan scholar, writer, historian and former ambassador
Kenza Tazi (born 1996), Moroccan alpine skier